Ted Russell Kamp is an American singer-songwriter. He is the bassist for Shooter Jennings' backing band. As a solo artist, Kamp has released 11 albums.

Biography
Born in New York, Kamp grew up in the Northeast U.S. before moving to Seattle where he began his music career. He fronted a trio, Ponticello, which released four albums. During this time, Kamp released his first solo album, Dedications (1996). Kamp moved to Los Angeles in 2001 and started a new group, Union Pacific. He performed with other bands and worked as a session musician before being hired as the bassist for Shooter Jennings' band, the .357s.

Kamp also continued his solo career, with his album Divisadero ranked as #34 on the Americana Music Association's 2007 chart.

In 2011, Kamp released Get Back to the Land, which made the top 25 on the Americana Radio Chart and was #1 on the Euro Americana Chart.

In January 2013, Kamp released Night Owl, which made the US Americana Radio Chart (#34) and the Euro Americana Chart (#15).

Kamp self-released The Low and Lonesome Sound in 2015, followed a year later by the acoustic album Flying Solo. He joined Ted Wulfers to record the classic song Tulsa Time to help support the Red Cross of Oklahoma. 100% of the proceeds were donated to The Oklahoma Red Cross.

Kamp is also an established producer in the music industry.

Discography

Solo albums
 1996: Dedications (Poetry Of The Moment [PoMo])
 2005: Northsouth (PoMo)
 2005: The Ponticello Years (Kufala)
 2006: Nashville Fineline (Kufala)
 2007: Divisadero (PoMo)
 2008: Poor Man's Paradise (Dualtone / PoMo)
 2010: California Country Soul, Vol. 2 : Ballads (PoMo)
 2011: Get Back To The Land (Dualtone / PoMo)
 2013: Night Owl (PoMo)
 2015: The Low and Lonesome Sound (self-released via CD Baby)
 2016: Flying Solo [Audio & Video Labs, Inc.)
 2019: Walkin' Shoes (PoMo Records)

With Shooter Jennings
 2005: Put the "O" Back in Country (Universal South)
 2006: Electric Rodeo (Universal South)
 2006: Live at Irving Plaza 4.18.06 (Universal South)
 2014: Don't Wait Up (For George) EP (Black Country Rock)
 2016: Black Ribbons (Black Country Rock)
 2016: Countach (For Giorgio) (Black Country Rock)

As primary artist/song contributor
 2009: various artists - A Bob Dylan Tribute: So Happy Just To See You Smile (Hanky Panky) - track 15, "Dignity"
 2010: various artists - I LIke It Better Here - More Music From Home (Hemifrån) - track 14, "You Are My Home"

As guest musician
 2007: Gina Villalobos - Miles Away (Face West)
 2008: Waylon Jennings and the 357's - Waylon Forever (Vagrant)
 2010: Shy Blakeman - Long Distance Man (Winding Road)
 2014: Calico the Band - Rancho California (California Country)
 2014: Creekwood - '2000 Miles West 2015: Alice Wallace - Memories Music & Pride (California Country)
 2015: Sam Morrow - There is No Map (Forty Below / Relativity)
 2016: Ry Bradley - You Me and the Music (self-released)
 2018: Dale Justice - Trouble Man (Hillbilly Highway)
 2021: Chris Armes - Ocotillo Rose (Yucca Thunder)

References

External links
 Official Website
 
 
 Ted Russell Kamp - Divisadero Review in No Depression''

Living people
American country rock singers
American male singer-songwriters
Year of birth missing (living people)